Senator Carlin may refer to:

David Carlin (born 1938), Rhode Island State Senate
Thomas Carlin (1789–1852), Illinois State Senate

See also
Richard J. Carling (born 1937), Utah State Senate